Bryn Evans may refer to:

 Bryn Evans (rugby league) (1899–1975), English rugby league footballer who played in the 1920s and 1930s for Great Britain, England, Lancashire and Swinton
 Bryn Evans (rugby union, born 1902) Welsh rugby union player.
 Bryn Evans (rugby union, born 1984) New Zealand rugby union player.